Will C. Crawford High School, also known as Crawford High School and formerly Crawford Educational Complex, is a high school located in the El Cerrito neighborhood of San Diego, California United States. In the fall of 2012, the school was reorganized as a traditional school with one principal and two vice principals, and returned to its original name, Will C. Crawford High School.

As of the 2018–19 school year, the school had an enrollment of 1,119 students and 48.54 classroom teachers (on an FTE basis), for a student–teacher ratio of 23:05:1. There were 931 students (20.19% of enrollment) eligible for free lunch and 81 (7.24% of students) eligible for reduced-cost lunch.

It is part of the San Diego Unified School District.  Erected in 1957 and dedicated in 1958, it is a comprehensive school serving 1,500 students in grades 9–12.

History

Naming
The school was named after Dr. Will C. Crawford, Superintendent of the San Diego Unified Schools from 1934 to 1954. It was officially opened during a dedication ceremony on April 27, 1958.

Mascot and Colors
In 1957, the incoming Horace Mann Junior High School graduating 9th grade class and transfer students from Hoover High School formed the 10th and 11th grade classes (at the time, the school was 10th through 12th grade). There was no 12th grade the first year.  The entire student body of Crawford High School decided on the school colors and mascot. Crimson, white and blue were chosen. The mascot was chosen in line with Dr. Crawford's other career as an Air Force pilot; the student body voted for it to be some kind of aircraft or bird. To keep with the rivalry with Hoover High School (whose mascot was the Cardinal), and because the yearbook was named Centaur, it was decided that the mascot would be the Colt. The alma mater was later written, and the Pacer newspaper was founded.

Crawford Educational Complex
Crawford High School reopened in 2004 as the Crawford Educational Complex through a grant from the Bill and Melinda Gates Foundation. It consisted of four schools within a school: the School of Law and Business (LAB), Multimedia and Visual Arts School (MVAS), Invention and Design Educational Academy (IDEA) and the School of Community Health and Medical Practices (CHAMPs). The small schools were closed due to district budget cuts, and the school returned to a comprehensive campus in the fall of 2012.

50th anniversary
In the 2007–2008 school year, Crawford celebrated its 50th anniversary. The campus was repainted blue and crimson by the end of the school year.

The automotive department was reopened and rededicated by State Superintendent of Instruction Jack O'Connell. The department achieved NATEF (National Automotive Technician Education Foundation) certification on the one-year anniversary of its opening.

2010's
The school established a "restorative justice" program in 2014.

Reconstruction
In 2015, San Diego Unified School District announced a modernization project, with new athletic fields and improvements at Horace Mann Middle School & Will C. Crawford High School. The project began in the 2015–2016 school year.

Feeder schools
Public feeder schools include two middle schools and ten elementary schools.

Middle schools:
Horace Mann Middle School
Monroe Clark Middle School

Elementary schools:
Andrew Jackson Elementary School
Carver Elementary School
Euclid Elementary School
Hardy Elementary School
Henry Clay Elementary School
Herbert Ibarra Elementary School
John Marshall Elementary School
Mary Lanyon Fay Elementary School
Oak Park Elementary School
Rolando Park Elementary School

Curriculum
Crawford High consists of a 4x4 block schedule, which means that students are able to complete four full classes a semester (fall term and spring term) totaling eight full classes a year, rather than the traditional six year-long courses. This enables students to complete a full year's curriculum in a more condensed term, allowing them to enroll in additional electives or ROP courses.

Community service requirements
All students are required to complete 20 to 40 hours of community service a year. Opportunities for community service are available through on or off campus organizations, or students may complete this requirement independently. On-campus organizations include Division 11 Key Club, a community service organization which recently returned to Crawford during the 2010–2011 school year; Peer Helping, the largest and most active service organization started by teacher Julie Reinhardt in the early 1990s; and Auroras, a senior honor society (requiring a GPA over 3.0) specializing in service, which has been on campus since the 1960s. Crawford boasts its own garden, and internships are available to current students. Off-campus organizations include the San Diego Asian Youth Organization and the East African Youth Organization, both based at the UPAC center. Community service requirements were put forth in an effort to boost college acceptances.

Centaur
Centaur is Crawford's award-winning, nationally recognized yearbook. It consistently takes best of class and places in the top two at the San Diego County Fair and other contests. A centaur is a Greek mythological creature that is half human and half horse.

San Diego County Fair awards

Annual events
Crawford hosts many traditional annual events.

The Welcome Back Dance is hosted at the beginning of the school year, and each year a new theme is chosen.

Club Rush is held in the main quad every October to help encourage students to get involved in school clubs. Club booths are set up around the quad.

Spirit Week is a tradition that is held week-long during mid-October. It holds over several events, the Homecoming Game, Homecoming Dance, School Spirit days throughout the week, and multiple rallies.

The Harvest Festival is held on the Thursday one week from Thanksgiving Day. The school clubs participate by selling food at booths. Music and dance are performed in the main quad.

The Love Festival, similarly to the Harvest Festival, celebrates Valentines Day instead of Thanksgiving.

The Talent Show is held in December and April to showcase students' talents.

A dodgeball tournament between freshman, sophomores, juniors and seniors is held at the end of every semester. Finalists take on the school staff.

In celebration of Crawford's diversity, the International Affair event is held every May on the baseball field to remind students about their ethnic background and cultural spirit. Food booths, music and dance are included

The seniors take on the teachers in a basketball game held a couple of days before graduation.

A barbeque dedicated to the seniors is held on the same day as the yearbook signing party.

Class colors

Freshmen (Class of 2022) -  black

Sophomores (Class of 2021) -  red

Juniors (Class of 2020) -  blue

Seniors (Class of 2019) -  white

School colors - crimson, white, blue

Student clubs

Sports

Crawford's main rival is the neighboring Hoover Cardinals located west on El Cajon Boulevard. Other significant rivals include the Patrick Henry Patriots, Lincoln Hornets and Helix Scotties.

CIF Championships

Notable alumni

 Carlos Amezcua, TV news anchor
 Stephen Bishop, singer, songwriter
 Nathan East (musician), bass player (Eric Clapton, Michael Jackson, George Harrison...)
 Tim Blackwell, former professional baseball player (Boston Red Sox, Philadelphia Phillies, Montreal Expos, Chicago Cubs)
 Bob Boone, former catcher and manager in Major League Baseball, four-time All-Star
 Salvatore Joseph Cordileone, Archbishop of San Francisco, former Bishop of Oakland
 Dave Duncan, Major League Baseball player (Kansas City Athletics, Oakland Athletics, Cleveland Indians, Baltimore Orioles)
 Joan Embery, wildlife and environment preservationist
 Dave Engle, former professional baseball player (Minnesota Twins, Detroit Tigers, Montreal Expos, Milwaukee Brewers)
 Ed Herrmann, former professional baseball player (Chicago White Sox, New York Yankees, California Angels, Houston Astros, Montreal Expos)
 Sherri Lightner, San Diego City council member
 Kathy Najimy, actress
 Kadir Nelson, artist, author, and illustrator
 Jim Nettles, former professional baseball player (Minnesota Twins, Detroit Tigers, Kansas City Royals, Oakland Athletics)
 Sandi Patty, Gospel singer
 Jim Peterson, professional player, National Football League
 Chuck Rainey, former professional baseball player (Boston Red Sox, Chicago Cubs, Oakland Athletics)
 Mike Stamm, Olympic swimmer, silver medalist
 Brian Teacher, professional top-10 tennis player and coach
 Jack Tempchin, songwriter, Peaceful Easy Feeling, Eagles
 Malcolm Thomas, professional basketball player for Maccabi Tel Aviv
 Eric Watkins, journalist, Financial Times, Wall Street Journal, Lloyd's List
 Warren Wiebe, singer, songwriter (Celine Dion, David Foster)
 Dick Woodson, former professional baseball player (Minnesota Twins, New York Yankees)
 Valerie Ziegenfuss, top-ranked WTA tennis player

Alma mater

All hail Crawford High School, 
Crimson, white and blue, 
Loyalty and honor 
We will pledge to you, 
Our banner's always waving, 
Crowned with victory, 
All hail Crawford High School, 
We will be true to thee!

See also
 List of high schools in San Diego County, California
List of high schools in California
 Primary and secondary schools in San Diego, California
San Diego Unified School District

References

External links
 Crawford High School 
 Crawford High School Alumni Association 
 Crawford Colts
San Diego Unified School District
School Data for the West Morris Regional High School District, National Center for Education Statistics

High schools in San Diego
Public high schools in California
1957 establishments in California